The Uzbekistan women's national artistic gymnastics team represents Uzbekistan in FIG international competitions.

History
After the fall of the Soviet Union, a handful of former Soviet gymnasts started competing for Uzbekistan. Uzbekistan has never fielded a team at the Olympic Games; however they have sent at least one gymnast to each Olympic Games since 1996.  Their 2012 Olympian, Luiza Galiulina, was disqualified after testing positive for the banned diuretic drug furosemide.

Uzbek gymnast Oksana Chusovitina holds many Olympic records for the sport of gymnasts: at the 2020 Olympic Games, Chusovitina was 46 years old, making her the oldest female Olympic gymnast ever.  Additionally she has competed at eight Olympic games (five of which she competed for Uzbekistan), the most of any Olympic gymnast.

Senior roster

Most decorated gymnasts
This list includes all Uzbek female artistic gymnasts who have won a medal at the Olympic Games or the World Artistic Gymnastics Championships.  Medals that Oksana Chusovitina won while competing for the Soviet Union, the Unified Team, and Germany are not included; only medals won for Uzbekistan.

See also 
 List of Olympic female artistic gymnasts for Uzbekistan
 Soviet Union women's national artistic gymnastics team

References

Gymnastics in Uzbekistan
National women's artistic gymnastics teams
Gym